Pretty Little Demons was an American pop rock duo formed in Los Angeles, California, in 2012 by guitarist and vocalist Lydia Night and drummer Marlhy Murphy. They are the youngest group to have played South by Southwest and have performed onstage with Brett Anderson of The Donnas and Exene Cervenka of X. Both Murphy and Night went on to form punk rock band The Regrettes in 2015. L.J. Williamson of LA Weekly described the band as the "Best Band To Blow A Little Girl's Mind".

Musical style
The band's musical style has been categorized as pop rock, power punk, garage rock, and pop punk, citing influences including John Bonham, Bloc Party, Arctic Monkeys, Fleetwood Mac, Alison Mosshart, The Marvelettes, Diana Ross and Four Tops. Brett Anderson of The Donnas said that "They work hard, play harder, and their songwriting skills belie their years."

Discography
Studio albums
Unknown Species (2014)

EPs
Flowers (2013)

Members
Lydia Night - lead vocals, guitar
Marlhy Murphy - drums, backing vocals

References

All-female punk bands
American pop rock music groups
American power pop groups
Garage rock groups from California
Pop punk groups from California
Musical groups established in 2012
Musical groups disestablished in 2015
2012 establishments in California
American musical duos